To Speak of Wolves is an American metalcore band from Greensboro, North Carolina, formed in 2007. The band has released three full-length studio albums, Myself < Letting Go, Find Your Worth, Come Home, and Dead in the Shadow. The band was founded by Phil Chamberlain, the brother of Underoath frontman and now the frontman for Sleepwave, Spencer Chamberlain, Aaron Shelton and Chris Shelton formerly of the Human Flight Committee, Drew Fulk, and Matthew Goldfarb.

History
To Speak of Wolves was founded in 2007 with ex-members of several touring bands, including Sullivan, This Runs Through and Human Flight Committee. They signed with Tragic Hero Records and released their first EP, Following Voices. Following this, the band went through a number of line-up changes, before settling on the current line-up and signing with Solid State Records.

In 2010, they released their first full-length album, Myself < Letting Go. In late 2010, the lead vocalist, Rick Jacobs, left the band, being replaced by the former Oh, Sleeper merchandise man, Gage Speas. The bass guitarist, Will McCutcheon, left the band and was replaced by Seth Webster.

The band's second album, Find Your Worth, Come Home, was released on May 22, 2012, on Solid State Records. This was the first To Speak of Wolves album with William "Gage" Speas as the lead vocalist.

In 2016, the band announced a comeback and a new EP entitled New Bones that was released September 16, 2016 on Cardigan Records.

Members
Current members
Phil Chamberlain - drums (since 2007)
Andrew Gaultier- lead and rhythm guitar, backup vocals (since 2016)
William "Gage" Speas - lead vocals (since 2011)
Seth Webster - bass (since 2012) (ex-Upon A Burning Body)

Former members
Rick Jacobs - lead vocals (2009–2011)
Will McCutcheon - bass, backing vocals (2009-2012)
Corey Doran - rhythm guitar (2009-2016), lead guitar (2016)
Aaron Shelton - lead vocals (2008-2009), backing vocals, rhythm guitar (2007-2008)
Aaron Marsh - lead vocals (2007-2008)
Chris Shelton - bass (2007-2009)
Matthew "Goldie" Goldfarb - lead guitar (2007-2009)
Drew Fulk - rhythm guitar (2007-2009), lead guitar (2007-2008)
Aaron Kisling - lead guitar (2009-2016)

Timeline

Discography
Studio albums
 Myself < Letting Go (2010, Solid State)
 Find Your Worth, Come Home (2012, Solid State)
 Dead in the Shadow (2017, Solid State)
EPs
 Following Voices (2009, Tragic Hero)
 New Bones (2016, Cardigan)

References

Heavy metal musical groups from North Carolina
Metalcore musical groups from North Carolina
American Christian metal musical groups
American post-hardcore musical groups
Musical groups established in 2007
Solid State Records artists
Tragic Hero Records artists